The Connecticut C-Dogs were a low-level professional ice hockey team in the North East Professional Hockey League.  They played their home games at the DiLungo Ice Rink. They began play in mid-November 2009 and ceased operations in late-December 2009.

References

External links
North East Professional Hockey League website

Ice hockey teams in Connecticut
East Haven, Connecticut
North East Professional Hockey League
2009 establishments in Connecticut
2009 disestablishments in Connecticut
Ice hockey clubs established in 2009
Ice hockey clubs disestablished in 2009
Sports in New Haven, Connecticut